Dawunt (Amharic: ዳውንት) is a woreda in Amhara Region, Ethiopia. Part of the Semien (North) Wollo Zone, Dawunt is bordered on the south by the Checheho River which separated it from the Debub Wollo Zone, on the west by the Semien Gondar Zone, on the northwest by Meket, on the north by Wadla, and on the east by Delanta. Dawunt was part of former Dawuntna Delant woreda.

Demographics
Based on the 2007 national census conducted by the Central Statistical Agency of Ethiopia (CSA), this woreda has a total population of 65,363, of whom 33,310 are men and 32,053 women; 528 or 0.81% are urban inhabitants. The majority of the inhabitants practiced Ethiopian Orthodox Christianity, with 77.98% reporting that as their religion, while 21.98% of the population said they were Muslim.

Notes

Districts of Amhara Region